Agios Germanos,, is a village in the Prespes Municipality in West Macedonia, Greece. Agios Germanos is located at an altitude of approximately 1,100 meters (3,606 feet), on a hillside, part of the Varnoundas Mountains.

Name
Until 1926, the village was known as German. In Macedonian and Bulgarian, it is known as Герман, German and the name of the settlement comes from the old village church Sveti German (Saint Germanus). In Albanian, the village is called Gjerman. The modern Greek name Agios Germanos means "Saint Germanus".

Features
The village is the only village in the Prespes region that has preserved all of the old stone houses. The Byzantine church that forms the nucleus of the present village dates to the beginning of the 11th century. It has very interesting frescos painted in three different phases. Nearby, the church of Agios Athanasios was built at the end of the 18th century.

The village is especially known among tourists for hiking, bird watching and the Agios Germanos river with falls, which has the endangered species of Prespa trout.  Agios Germanos river is on the northeast of the village.  One can also see the restored water mills along the river.

Following the paths, one can reach the impressive mixed fir-beech forests, and the summits of Kitsevo or Despotiko (2,177m).  The Sarakatsani, nomadic shepherds from Thessaly, have the tradition of bringing their herds to graze on these mountains every year from May to October.

Just north of the village is an early 20th-century church built by Steven Doinidis.  This church is kept up by the villagers, who number just over 200 as of 2008.

Demographics 
According to Bosnian ethnographer Stefan Verković, in 1889 the village had 213 households and a population of 1016 Bulgarians. In 1900, 680 Slavonic speaking Christians and 125 Albanian Muslims lived in the village. In 1905 the population had gone up to 1250 with 90 of them being Arnauts (Albanians) and the rest – Bulgarians. 

The Greek census (1920) recorded 1549 people in the village and in 1923 there were 135 inhabitants (or 17 families) who were Muslim. The Albanian village population was present until 1926 when it was replaced with prosfiges (Greek refugees), due to the Greek-Turkish population exchange. A separate neighbourhood of the village named Shaoftsi was inhabited by Muslims and later repopulated by Greek refugees. In 1926, there were 909 refugee families from Asia Minor in the village. The Greek census (1928) recorded 162 village inhabitants. After the Greek Civil War, the Macedonian speaking population decreased and in their place Aromanians and Greeks settled in the village. The Aromanians originated from Giannitsa and the region of Epirus. In the early 1970s, some 20 Christian Macedonian-speaking families resided in the village. 

Agios Germanos had 237 inhabitants in 1981. In fieldwork done by Riki Van Boeschoten in late 1993, Agios Germanos was populated by Aromanians, Slavophones and a Greek population descended from Anatolian Greek refugees who arrived during the Greek-Turkish population exchange. The Macedonian language was used by people of all ages, both in public and private settings, and as the main language for interpersonal relationships. Some elderly villagers had little knowledge of Greek. The Aromanian language was spoken in the village by people over 30 in public and private settings. Children understood the language, but mostly did not use it.

Gallery

References

External links
Prespes website

Populated places in Florina (regional unit)